Capaci is a town and comune in the Metropolitan City of Palermo in Sicily, Italy.
In 2011 the comune had a population of 11,045, with a density of 1,804.7 people per square kilometre.

The A29 autostrada running from Palermo to Punta Raisi Airport, and to the west and south-west of the island, passes through the commune. On 23 May 1992, this road was the scene of the assassination of anti-Mafia judge Giovanni Falcone and those with him, in an explosion known as the Capaci bombing. The site of the explosion is marked now by a memorial to those who were killed.

References 

Municipalities of the Metropolitan City of Palermo